An election to Carlow County Council took place on 10 June 1999 as part of that year's Irish local elections. 21 councillors were elected from five electoral divisions by PR-STV voting for a five-year term of office.

Results by party

Results by Electoral Area

Borris

Carlow No.1

Carlow No.2

Muinebheag

Tullow

External links
 Official website

1999 Irish local elections
1999